Lars Cleveman (born 16 June 1958) is a Swedish musician and opera singer.

Career
Together with Martin Rössel, Cleveman founded Sweden's first electronic underground group, Dom Dummaste. Additionally, Cleveman is a tenor opera singer, performing at the Royal Swedish Opera in Stockholm. He made his début at Covent Garden in 2009 as Tristan in Tristan und Isolde replacing an indisposed Ben Heppner and subsequently also sang at Bayreuther Festspiele during 2011.  In May 2013, Cleveman made his début at the Metropolitan Opera singing the role of Siegfried in the third of three performances of Wagner's Ring Cycle.

Recordings

With Dom Dummaste

Albums
 Lars Cleveman, Martin Rössel & Dom Dummaste, Sista Bussen, 1980. 		
 Sympati För Djävulen, MNWP 122, 1982.
 Revolverkäke, DD Records, 1983.
 Live Teater Schahrazad 25 November 1983, Not On Label, 1984 		
 4 Känsler, Criminal Records, 1992. 		
 The Backward Tapes, Sista Bussen, 1993 		
 Patrik, Criminal Records, 1997 		
 Fluffprestige 2000, Criminal Records, 2000 		
 Dom Dummaste, Launch Records, 2011

Singles & EPs
 Julsingel -81, Sista Bussen, 1981
 Huset E Fullt Me Syra, CBS, 1990

Compilations
 Var är ni nu Dom Dummaste?, Erik Axl Sund, 2018

With Cleveman Rössel
 Prayer Of Love. CD. The Label 2005.
 Memento, LP. Not an Label. 2012.

Solo
 The Ghost, single, DD-Records 1984.
 Cleveman, LP, DD-Records 1985.
 100 Wars of Jesus Christ, single, Eternal Love 1986.
 Première!. Songs and arias. Malena Karlsson, piano. Anders Dahls ensemble. Proprius PRCD9155. 1996. CD.
 Verdi: Don Carlos (titelroll). Chorus and Orchestra of the Royal Swedish Opera. Dirigent Alberto Hold-Garrido. 3 CD. Naxos 8.660096-98, 3 cd 1996.
 Mannen som begav sig. CD. Criminal Records 2002.
 Beethoven: Symfoni nr 9 (tenorpartiet), CD. Simax Classics 2009.
 Voices in My Head, CD. Polythene Records. 2009.
 Wagner: Ragnarök (Siegfried). Hallé Orchestra under ledning av Sir Mark Elder. 5 CD. Hallé CD HLD7525. 2010.
 Under The Influence, LP/CD, Outbox Music 2014.
 Wagner: Parsifal. Hallé Orchestra under ledning av Sir Mark Elder. 4 CD. Hallé CD HLD7539. 2017.

Opera Roles (highlights) 
 Don José in Carmen
 Hertigen Duca in Rigoletto
 lead in Werther
 Hoffman in Hoffmanns äventyr
 lead in Don Carlos
 Grigorij in Boris Godunov
 Manrico in Trubaduren
 Pinkerton in Madama Butterfly
 Des Grieux in Manon Lescaut
 lead in Othello
 Cavaradossi in Tosca
 lead in Parsifal
 Tristan in Tristan och Isolde
 lead in Siegfried
 Siegfried in Ragnarök
 Siegmund in Die Walküre
 lead in Tannhäuser
 lead in Stiffelio
 Riccardo/Gustavo in Maskeradbalen
 Eleazar in La Juive av Fromental Halevy

References

External links 
 Official website of Dom Dummaste

Swedish male musicians
1958 births
Living people